Azikovo is a rural locality (a village) in Tolpukhovskoye Rural Settlement, Sobinsky District, Vladimir Oblast, Russia. The population was 29 as of 2010. There are 2 streets.

Geography 
Azikovo is located 32 km north of Sobinka (the district's administrative centre) by road. Krutoy Ovrag is the nearest rural locality.

References 

Rural localities in Sobinsky District